The adjutant general of Illinois is the senior officer of the Illinois Army National Guard, Illinois Air National Guard, and state defense forces of Illinois. The Illinois Naval Militia was also part of the adjutant general's command, until it was disbanded.

Major General Richard R. Neely is the 40th Adjutant General of the State of Illinois. He assumed the duties of the Adjutant General on 8 February 2019 upon the retirement of Major General Richard Hayes. He serves as a member of the Governor's Cabinet as the Director of the Illinois Department of Military Affairs and is the Governor's principal advisor on military matters. As the Adjutant General, he is responsible for carrying out Illinois National Guard missions in supporting civil authorities during domestic operations and emergency relief efforts, operational readiness and supporting U.S. military operations across the world. General Neely is the senior officer in the chain-of-command for both the Illinois Air and Army National Guard. He is responsible for the daily operations of the Illinois National Guard and oversees approximately 13,000 men and women in uniform (2,286 full time) and 230 civilian employees in the Illinois Department of Military Affairs. General Neely works closely with the leadership of National Guard Bureau and the Departments of the Army and Air Force.

Historically, the Adjutant General of Illinois also commands the state defense forces of Illinois, including the Illinois Reserve Militia and the Illinois Naval Militia.

History
While the post dates back to territorial days, before the Civil War the position was, with the exception of the Black Hawk War, mainly honorary and the pay negligible. The Adjutant general was effectively the chief of the Governor's staff. As the Civil War broke out the post became important. Colonel Thomas S. Mather resigned to enter active service, and Judge Allen C. Fuller was appointed, remaining in office until 1 January 1865.

The office of Adjutant-General for the State of Illinois, as such, was created by act of the legislature on 2 February 1865.

The first appointee was Isham N. Haynie, who served until 1869, when he died in office. Reviewing the role in 1869, as the volunteer army had been mustered out, and the duties of the Adjutant General correspondingly decreased, the legislature reduced the size of the department and its funds. After the adoption of the 1877 military code, the Adjutant General again became prominent within the state government.

Holders of the post

Territorial period
 Elias Rector
 Robert Morrison
 1813-1814 - Benjamin Stephenson
 April 24, 1819 William Alexander

Statehood to Civil War
 April 24, 1819 – 1821 William Alexander
 June 11, 1821 – 1828 Elijah C. Berry
 December 19, 1828 – 1839 James W. Berry
 December 16, 1839 – 1857 Moses K. Anderson
 April 3, 1857 – 1857 Simon Bolivar Buckner
 December 9, 1857 – 1858 William C. Kinney
 October 28, 1858 – November 11, 1861 Thomas S. Mather

Civil War
 November 11, 1861-1 January 1865 Allen C. Fuller

Adjutant General for the State of Illinois
 January 16, 1865 – 1869: Isham N. Haynie
 March 24, 1869 – 1873: Hubert Dilger
 January 24, 1873 – 1875: Edwin L. Higgins
 July 2, 1875 – 1881: Hiram Hilliard
 August 1, 1881 – 1884: Isaac H. Elliott
 May 15, 1884 – 1891: Joseph W. Vance
 June 28, 1891 – 1893: Jasper N. Reece (also 1897-1902)
 January 20, 1893 – 1896: Alfred Orendorff
 January 4, 1896 – 1897: Charles C. Hilton
 February 2, 1897 – 1902: Jasper N. Reece (also 1891-1893)
 April 19, 1902 – 1903: James B. Smith (died in office)
 July 1, 1903 – 1909: Thomas W. Scott (died in office)
 January 1, 1910 – 1922: Frank S. Dickson
 February 7, 1922 – 1939: Carlos E. Black
 August 24, 1939 – 1940: Lawrence V. Regan
 November 8, 1940 – 1969: Leo Martin Boyle
 1969-1978: Harold R. Patton
 1983-1991: Harold G. Holesinger
 1991-1995: Donald W. Lynn
 1995-1999: Richard G. Austin
 1999-2003: David C. Harris
 2003-2007: Randal E. Thomas
 2007-2012: William L. Enyart
 June 7, 2012 – December 21, 2012    : Dennis Celletti (acting)
 December 21, 2012 – June 8, 2015: Daniel M. Krumrei
June 8, 2015 – February 15, 2019: Richard J. Hayes Jr.
February 15, 2019 - : Richard R. Neely

References